Club Paradise is a 1986 American comedy film.

Club Paradise may also refer to:

 "Club Paradise", a song from the album Take Care by Canadian recording artist Drake
 Club Paradise Tour, a  concert tour by Drake
 Sensation Hunters (1945 film), a film also known as Club Paradise